Charles Edward Emanuel (born June 3, 1973 in Indiantown, Florida) is a former safety in the National Football League. He played for the Philadelphia Eagles. He played college football at West Virginia.

External links
Stats

1973 births
Living people
People from Indiantown, Florida
American football safeties
West Virginia Mountaineers football players
Philadelphia Eagles players